Reverend is the 1989 EP debut by the American heavy metal band of the same name. This was Reverend's only studio EP until 2001's A Gathering of Demons.

Track listing

Lineup
David Wayne: Vocals
Brian Korban: Guitars
Stuart Fujinami: Guitars
Dennis O'Hara: Bass
Scott Vogel: Drums

References

1989 albums
Reverend (band) albums